Fairview is an unincorporated community in Adams County, in the U.S. state of Ohio.

History
Fairview was laid out in 1844. The post office Fairview once had was called Hill's Fork. The Hill's Fork post office was established in 1857, and remained in operation until 1904.

References

Unincorporated communities in Adams County, Ohio
1844 establishments in Ohio
Populated places established in 1844
Unincorporated communities in Ohio